Hanna Eriksson (born 1 February 1984) is a breaststroke m and medley swimmer from Sweden. She won a silver medal at the European SC Championships 2005 in Trieste, Italy after Finnish Hanna-Maria Seppälä.

In 2019, she represented Sweden at the 2019 World Aquatics Championships held in Gwangju, South Korea. She competed in the women's 800 metre freestyle. She did not advance to the final. She also competed in the women's 4 × 100 metre freestyle relay event.

Clubs
Södertälje SS

References

1984 births
Living people
Swedish female medley swimmers
Swedish female freestyle swimmers
21st-century Swedish women